Jóhannes úr Kötlum (born Jóhannes Bjarni Jónasson, November 4, 1899 – April 27, 1972) was an Icelandic author/poet and a member of parliament. He is one of the most loved Icelandic poets – not least for his verse for children and how beautifully his words flow in the Icelandic language making them ideal for songs.  His poems have been a constant inspiration for composers, songwriters and musicians in Iceland. More than two hundred songs and compositions have been written based on his poems, some of them performed by internationally acclaimed artists such as Björk performing the song "The Christmas Cat".

One of the salient figures of modern Icelandic poetry, Jóhannes mastered both the intricate traditional forms and the modern, but as an outspoken, idealistic and sometimes scathing critic of political institutions, he courted controversy and often drew the ire of political opponents. Jóhannes began his career as a neo-romantic poet in the 1920s, but later became a leading force among the radical poets of the depression era. After WWII he revolted against the traditional form, renewing his poetry through his originality and artistry. He was a spokesman for peace throughout his life and fought vigorously against Iceland’s occupation by foreign armies.

Life
Jóhannes was born in 1899 at Goddastaðir farmstead, near the head of Hvammsfjörður in the Dales of Northwestern Iceland. Despite poverty, Jóhannes was educated and graduated as a primary school teacher in 1921, a profession he practiced for more than a decade, first in the countryside and then in Reykjavík. From then on he worked as an editor and an author, first in Reykjavík and then in 1940 when he moved to Hveragerði, a small town in the South of Iceland which became known as the Artists Colony in the 1940s. He moved back to Reykjavík in 1959 where he lived from then on.

Works
In 1932, Jóhannes úr Kötlum published his best-loved children's book: Jólin koma (Christmas is Coming – Verse for Children). One of the poems in the book, "The Yuletide-Lads," reintroduced Icelandic society to Yuletide folklore and established what is now considered the canonical thirteen Yuletide-lads or Yule Lads, their personalities and connection to other folkloric characters. Since then Christmas is Coming has been an integral part of Icelandic Christmas traditions and helped preserve age-old folklore in modern culture. A seasonal bestseller from the start, few other books have been reprinted as many times in Iceland.

Awards and nominations
Jóhannes received awards for his celebratory verses in the Parliament Millennium Celebrations of 1930 and the Republic of Iceland Festivities in 1944. He was awarded the Silver Horse, the Icelandic Newspapers Literature Award, in 1970. He was nominated twice for the Nordic Council Literature Prize; in 1966 and 1973.

Bibliography

Poetry
 1926: Bí bí og blaka
 1929: Álftirnar kvaka, poems
 1932: Ég læt sem ég sofi, poems
 1932: Jólin koma, poems (for children) - established what is now considered the canonical thirteen Yule Lads
 1933: Ömmusögur (for children)
 1935: Samt mun ég vaka
 1937: Hrímhvita móðir
 1939: Hart er í heimi
 1940: Eilífðar smáblóm
 1941: Bakkabræður (for children)
 1945: Sól tér sortna
 1946: Ljóðið um Labbakút (for children)
 1949: Ljóðasafn I-II selected poems
 1952: Sóleyjarkvæði
 1952: Hlið hins himneska friðar
 1955: Sjödægra
 1959: Vísur Ingu Dóru (for children)
 1962: Óljóð
 1964: Tregaslagur
 1966: Mannssonurinn
 1970: Ný og nið
 1972-76: Ljóðasafn I-VIII, selected poems
 1984: Ljóðasafn IX, selected poems
 1987: Saga af Suðurnesjum (for children)
 1988: Segja vil ég sögu af sveinunum þeim (for children)
 2001: Jólin okkar (for children)
 2010: Ljóðaúrval, selected poems

Novels
 1934: Og björgin klofnuðu
 1943: Verndarenglarnir
 1949: Dauðsmannsey
 1950: Siglingin mikla
 1951: Frelsisálfan

Stories
 1938: Fuglinn segir (for children)

Essays
 1958: Roðasteinninn og ritfrelsið
 1965: Vinaspegill

Translations 
 1934: Kak I (with Sigurður Thorlacius) Vilhjalmur Stefansson and Violet Irwin
 1935: Kak II (with Sigurður Thorlacius) Vilhjalmur Stefansson and Violet Irwin
 1935: Mamma litla I (with Sigurður Thorlacius) Élise de Pressensé
 1936: Mamma litla II (with Sigurður Thorlacius) Élise de Pressensé
 1938: Himalajaförin (with Sigurður Thorlacius) Queling
 1946: Salamöndrustríðið Karel Čapek
 1946: Fimm synir Howard Fast
 1948: Annarlegar tungur (various selected poets)
 1955: Saga af sönnum manni Boris Nikolaevich Polevoĭ
 1957: Vegurinn til lífsins I Anton Semyonovich Makarenko
 1957: Vegurinn til lífsins II Anton Semyonovich Makarenko
 1958: Frú Lúna í snörunni Agnar Mykle

References

External links
Jóhannes Bjarni Jónasson Encyclopædia Britannica entry
 johannes.is - Ritaskrár

Kotlum, Johannes ur
Kotlum, Johannes ur
Icelandic poets
Icelandic communists
20th-century Icelandic people
Johannes ur Kotlum